Mark McGregor Shelton (born November 8, 1956) is an American physician working as a pediatrician at the Cook Children's Medical Center in Fort Worth, Texas. He previously served as a Republican member of the Texas House of Representatives. From 2009 to 2013, he represented House District 97 in Tarrant County. He is a graduate of Arlington's Lamar High School, and received a BS from Baylor University. Shelton completed his medical studies at the Texas A&M University College of Medicine.

Background
Shelton grew up in Arlington, Texas. Part of a family of Scouters, he earned the rank of Eagle Scout.

Shelton has served as the director of the Pediatric Infectious Diseases Program at the Cook Children's Medical Center in Fort Worth, Texas, since 1988.

He has been involved in the community. He has served as a volunteer with the Longhorn Council of the Boy Scouts, the Ronald McDonald House of Fort Worth, and board member of the Lena Pope Home.

References

External links

1956 births
Living people
People from Arlington, Texas
People from Fort Worth, Texas
Republican Party members of the Texas House of Representatives
American pediatricians
Lamar High School (Arlington, Texas) alumni
Baylor University alumni
Texas A&M Health Science Center College of Medicine alumni
Baptists from Texas
21st-century American politicians